The Journal of Comparative Effectiveness Research is a peer-reviewed medical journal that was established in 2012 and is published by Future Medicine. The editors-in-chief are Sheldon Greenfield (University of California, Irvine) and Eugene Rich (Mathematica Policy Research). The journal covers all aspects of comparative effectiveness research, including patient-centered outcomes research, pharmacoeconomics and health economics, relating to diagnostics, therapeutics, surgical procedures, or other healthcare services or options.

Abstracting and indexing 
The journal is abstracted and indexed in EMBASE/Excerpta Medica, EMCare, Index Medicus/MEDLINE/PubMed, Science Citation Index Expanded, and Scopus. According to the Journal Citation Reports, the journal has a 2016 impact factor of 1.204, ranking it 75th out of 90 journals in the category "Health Care Sciences & Services".

References

External links 
 

English-language journals
Bimonthly journals
Public health journals
Publications established in 2012
Future Science Group academic journals
Health economics journals